Rajkumar Das (born 1 April 1969) is former Indian first-class cricketer from Assam. He played  6 first-class matches for Assam. Das was a right-handed batsman and a left-arm medium bowler. His first First Class century was at the age of 18 years 316 days, when he scored 170. His last First Class match came at the age of 20 only, and ended his career with only 6 First Class matches, but with a batting average of 40.

References

External links
 

1969 births
Living people
Indian cricketers
Assam cricketers
Cricketers from Guwahati
Cricketers from Assam